Jevaughn Powell (born 19 November 2000) is a track and field athlete from Jamaica.

Jevaughn Powell won the Jamaican national championships over 400 metres in 2022. At the 2022 World Athletics Championships in Eugene, Oregon Powell didn’t qualify from the heats but did run in the 4 x 400 metres relay in which the team won the silver medal.

References

2000 births
Living people
World Athletics Championships athletes for Jamaica
Jamaican male sprinters
21st-century Jamaican people